Radio Gelderland is a regional public radio station for the Dutch province of Gelderland. Its history started in 1965 when Gelderland joined the RONO (Radio Omroep Noord en Oost). The RONO was already broadcasting for the north and east of the Netherlands. In 1977 RONO split into Radio Noord for Groningen and Drenthe, Radio Fryslân for Friesland and Radio Oost for Overijssel and Gelderland. Since 1985 Radio Gelderland is an independent broadcaster.

Radio Gelderland can be received on analogue terrestrial radio on 103.5 MHz FM Veluwe, 88.9 MHz FM Arnhem/Nijmegen, 90.4 MHz FM Achterhoek and 99.6 MHz FM Betuwe, and via DAB+ . It's also available on cable (both analogue and digital), free-to-air on the Digital Terrestrial Television platform Digitenne, free-to-air on the Satellite television platform CanalDigitaal, IPTV platforms, Fiber-to-the-home platforms and on the internet.

References

External links
 Omroep Gelderland website (Mobile) 

Radio stations in the Netherlands
Netherlands Public Broadcasting
Radio stations established in 1985
1985 establishments in the Netherlands